The 2020 Men's World Floorball Championships was the 13th World Championships in men's floorball. The tournament took place in Helsinki, Finland, during 3–11 December 2021. The tournament was originally intended to be played between 4–12 December 2020, but on 7 December 2020, it was announced it would be rescheduled one year into the future because of to the Coronavirus pandemic.

WFC 2020 qualification 

35 teams registered for the 13th IFF Men's World Floorball Championships.  16 qualified reach to the final championship.  Host country, Finland, qualified automatically.  Though they did not ultimately qualify, Côte d'Ivoire became the first ever team from Africa to participate in the WFC Qualifiers.

In Europe, there were six qualification groups with three event locations – Frederikshavn in Denmark, Poprad in Slovakia, and Liepāja in Latvia.  The Asia-Oceania qualifier in Bangkok, Thailand, was cancelled due to the COVID-19 pandemic. Instead the highest ranked countries of the region were qualified. USA and Canada both qualified automatically due to the World Games taking place in the United States in 2022.

1.Australia and Japan confirmed to IFF that they were unable to travel due to COVID-19 travel restrictions, hence their withdrawal from the competition.
2.On September 28, 2021, the IFF Central Board confirmed the inclusion of Estonia and the Philippines to replace Australia and Japan.

Venues

Tournament groups 
After the group ballot, 16 teams are divided into 4 groups. In the group stage each team plays each other once, while the second stage of the event includes play-offs and placement matches.

The two best teams of group A and B go directly to the quarter-final. Teams placed 3rd and 4th in group A and B and the teams placed 1st and 2nd in group C and D make it to the first playoff round (played before the quarter-finals).

1.Estonia and the Philippines replaced Australia and Japan.

Results

Preliminary round

Group A

Group B

Group C

Group D

Knock-out stage

Play-off

Quarterfinals

Semifinals

Bronze medal game

Final

Placement matches

5th place bracket

5th–8th place semi-finals

5th place match

7th place match

9th place bracket

9th–12th place semi-finals

9th place match

11th place match

13th place bracket

13th–16th place semi-finals

13th place match

15th place match

Ranking and statistics

Final ranking
The official IFF final ranking of the tournament:

Qualification for the 2022 World Games

References

External links 
 Tournament webpage

Floorball World Championships
2020 in floorball
2021 in floorball
International floorball competitions hosted by Finland
World Floorball Championships
Floorball Championships, 2020 World Men's
